2069 Hubble, provisional designation , is a carbonaceous asteroid from the outer region of the asteroid belt, approximately 40 kilometers in diameter. It was discovered on 29 March 1955, by the Indiana Asteroid Program at Goethe Link Observatory, United States, and named after American astronomer Edwin Hubble.

Orbit 

Hubble orbits the Sun in the outer main-belt at a distance of 2.6–3.7 AU once every 5 years and 7 months (2,052 days). Its orbit has an eccentricity of 0.19 and an inclination of 9° with respect to the ecliptic. Its first unused observations, was made at Goethe Link in 1953. The body's observation arc begins at NAOJ's Mitaka Campus, 8 days prior to its official discovery observation at Goethe Link.

Physical characteristics

Lightcurve 

In January 2005, American astronomer Brian Warner obtained a rotational lightcurve of Hubble from photometric observations taken at his Palmer Divide Observatory in Colorado. Lightcurve analysis showed an unusual tri-modal lightcurve with a rotation period of 32.52 hours and a brightness variation of 0.10 in magnitude. While not being a slow rotator, Hubble has a longer than average spin rate, as the vast majority of asteroids rotate between 2.2 and 20 hours once around their axis.

Diameter and albedo 

According to the surveys carried out by the Infrared Astronomical Satellite IRAS, the Japanese Akari satellite, and NASA's Wide-field Infrared Survey Explorer with its subsequent NEOWISE mission, Hubble measures between 34.53 and 46.92 kilometers in diameter, and its surface has an albedo between 0.024 and 0.0538. The Collaborative Asteroid Lightcurve Link classifies it as a carbonaceous C-type asteroid, derives an albedo of 0.041 and a shorter diameter of 34.44 kilometers with an absolute magnitude of 11.4.

Naming 

This minor planet was named after the famous American astronomer Edwin Hubble (1889–1953). He pioneered in the exploration of the Universe beyond the Milky Way galaxy and established a self-consistent distance scale as far as the 100-inch Hooker Telescope at Mount Wilson Observatory could reach. Hubble's law and the discovery of the expanding Universe were his greatest achievements. His classification scheme for galaxies, the Hubble sequence, is still the standard and often called the Hubble tuning-fork. Hubble also discovered the minor planet 1373 Cincinnati, his only asteroid discovery. The lunar crater Hubble is also named after him. The approved naming citation was published by the Minor Planet Center on 20 December 1983.

Notes

References

External links 
 Lightcurve plot of 2069 Hubble, Palmer Divide Observatory, B. D. Warner (2005)
 Asteroid Lightcurve Database (LCDB), query form (info )
 Dictionary of Minor Planet Names, Google books
 Asteroids and comets rotation curves, CdR – Observatoire de Genève, Raoul Behrend
 Discovery Circumstances: Numbered Minor Planets (1)-(5000) – Minor Planet Center
 
 

002069
002069
Named minor planets
19550329